Riolama grandis is a species of lizard in the family Gymnophthalmidae. It is endemic to Brazil.

References

Riolama
Reptiles of Brazil
Endemic fauna of Brazil
Reptiles described in 2020